Stanleya is a genus of six species of plants in the family Brassicaceae known commonly as prince's plumes. These are herbs or erect shrubs which bear dense, plumelike inflorescences of white to bright yellow flowers with long stamens. Stanleya species are native to the western United States. These plants are toxic because they concentrate selenium from the soil in their tissues.

Species:
Stanleya albescens - white prince's plume
Stanleya confertiflora - Oregon prince's plume
Stanleya elata - Panamint prince's plume
Stanleya pinnata - desert prince's plume
Stanleya tomentosa - woolly prince's plume
Stanleya viridiflora - green prince's plume

References

External links
 USDA Plants Profile for Stanleya
 Jepson Manual Treatment

Brassicaceae
Flora of the Western United States
Brassicaceae genera